Koodi Vazhnthal Kodi Nanmai is a 1959 Indian Tamil-language film produced by V. L. Narasu and directed by D. S. Rajagopal. The film stars S. S. Rajendran and B. Saroja Devi.

Plot 

The film story is woven with problems faced by people from different linguistic and other backgrounds. The hero is a Tamil speaking person. When he comes to Madras for employment, he finds it difficult to find accommodation. A Malayalam speaking person refuses to rent out a room for him. The hero meets the heroine while hailing for a taxi. They fall in love with each other. The story is complicated but all ends well educating the audience that unity is propitious for all.

Cast 
The list is compiled from the database of Film News Anandan and from the review article in the Hindu newspaper.

S. S. Rajendran
B. Saroja Devi
Prem Nazir
Girija
V. K. Ramasamy
S. V. Subbaiah
D. Balasubramaniam
Sayeeram
C. K. Saraswathi
Ganapathi Bhat
Ratnam
Lakshmi

Production 
The film was produced by V. L. Narasu under his own banner Narasu Studios and was filmed at his studio that bore the same name. However, the film was released after his death and therefore it was dedicated to his memory. D. S. Rajagopal directed the film while Thuraiyur Murthi wrote the screenplay and dialogues. Cinematography was by V. Kumaradevan. Art Director was Vasanth Biankar. K. N. Dandayudhapani Pillai and Jayaraman was in charge of Choreography. Kannappan handled the still photography.

Soundtrack 
Music was composed by T. Chalapathi Rao while the lyrics were penned by Thanjai N. Ramaiah Dass.

Release and reception 
Koodi Vazhnthal Kodi Nanmai was released on 14 February 1959, delayed from a Diwali 1958 release. According to film historian Randor Guy, it was an average success "mainly because of the predictable storyline and treatment".

References

External links 
 

1950s Tamil-language films
Films scored by T. Chalapathi Rao
Films set in Chennai
Films shot in Chennai
Indian black-and-white films
Indian drama films